All or Nothin' is the second studio album by American outlaw country singer Nikki Lane. It was released on May 6, 2014 on New West Records.

Background and recording
Lane recorded the album with producer Dan Auerbach, the frontman of the Black Keys, at his studio "Easy Eye Sound" in Nashville. Auerbach and Lane perform together on the album, in the duet "Love's on Fire". Lane co-wrote all 12 of the album's tracks and producer Auerbach co-wrote 5.

Critical reception
According to Metacritic, All or Nothin has a score of 79 out of 100, indicating generally favorable reviews from critics. Thom Jurek reviewed the album for AllMusic and gave it 3.5 stars out of 5, writing that "Lane's songs and delivery are strong throughout All or Nothin" and that on the album, "her vocals and arrangements co-exist to wed past to present both simultaneously and effortlessly."

Chris Richards, writing for the Washington Post, compared the album's sound to Wanda Jackson, Mazzy Star, and Link Wray. Jurek compared the album's song "Good Man" to the music of Lucinda Williams, who Lane has acknowledged is one of her major influences. Holly Gleason compared All or Nothin to the music of Dusty Springfield, Loretta Lynn and Jackie DeShannon.

Track listing
Source: AllMusic

Personnel 

 Ricardo Alessio - illustrations
 Dan Auerbach - producer, vocals (track 6)
 Tchad Blake - mixing
 Gary Briggs - A&R
 Ralph Carney - horn
 Glynis Carpenter - cover photo
 Spencer Cullun Jr. - pedal steel
 Collin Dupuis - engineer
 Bobby Emmett - keyboards
 Caroline "Chuck" H. Grant - back cover photo
 Joshua Hedley - fiddle
 Patrick Keeler - drums
 Carey Kotsionis - background vocals
 Nikki Lane - vocals, background vocals, guitar
 Brian Lucey - mastering
 The McCrary Sisters - background vocals
 Paul Moore - design
 Aaron Oliva - bass
 Russ Pahl - pedal steel
 Dave Roe - bass
 Danny Tomczak - studio assistant
 Kenny Vaughan - guitar

References

New West Records albums
2014 albums
Albums produced by Dan Auerbach
Nikki Lane albums